Colin MacDonald Jackson (8 October 1946 – 6 June 2015) was a Scottish footballer, who played predominantly for Rangers and the Scotland national team.

Career
Jackson, a defender, initially joined Rangers straight from Ruthrieston School in 1962. He had a spell with Aberdeen side Sunnybank Athletic before rejoining the Light Blues in 1963. He made a total of 506 appearances for Rangers between 1963 and 1982 and during his time at Ibrox won 3 League championships, 3 Scottish Cups and 5 League Cups. In the 1978–79 Scottish League Cup Final, he scored a last-minute winning goal. Perhaps the biggest disappointment during his career came when he missed out on Rangers' victory in the 1972 European Cup Winners' Cup Final, having failed a fitness test prior to the game against Moscow Dynamo.

Jackson was also recognised internationally by the Scottish League XI, Scotland under-23 and Scotland. He won a total of eight full international caps between 1975 and 1976, scoring one goal. In his eight full internationals he was unbeaten, with Scotland recording five wins and three draws.

After leaving Rangers, Jackson spent a month with Morton then the rest of the 1982–83 season with Partick Thistle. He retired in the summer of 1983 and became a partner in an East Kilbride printing venture. He lived in Rutherglen for over 30 years.

He died of leukaemia at his home on 6 June 2015.

See also
 List of Scotland international footballers born outside Scotland

References

External links
Rangers Hall of Fame profile
 

1946 births
2015 deaths
Scottish footballers
Footballers from Aberdeen
Banks O' Dee F.C. players
Rangers F.C. players
Greenock Morton F.C. players
Partick Thistle F.C. players
Scotland international footballers
Association football central defenders
Scottish Football League players
Scottish Football League representative players
Scotland under-23 international footballers
Deaths from leukemia
Sportspeople from Rutherglen
Anglo-Scots